In statistical theory, Chauvenet's criterion (named for William Chauvenet) is a means of assessing whether one piece of experimental data — an outlier — from a set of observations, is likely to be spurious.

Derivation
The idea behind Chauvenet's criterion is to find a probability band, centered on the mean of a normal distribution, that should reasonably contain all n samples of a data set.  By doing this, any data points from the n samples that lie outside this probability band can be considered to be outliers, removed from the data set, and a new mean and standard deviation based on the remaining values and new sample size can be calculated.  This identification of the outliers will be achieved by finding the number of standard deviations that correspond to the bounds of the probability band around the mean and comparing that value to the absolute value of the difference between the suspected outliers and the mean divided by the sample standard deviation (Eq.1).

where
   is the maximum allowable deviation,
  is the absolute value,
  is the value of suspected outlier,
  is sample mean, and
  is sample standard deviation.

In order to be considered as including all  observations in the sample, the probability band (centered on the mean) must only account for  samples (if  then only 2.5 of the samples must be accounted for in the probability band). In short, we are looking for the probability, that is equal to  out of  samples (Eq.2).

where
  is the probability band centered on the sample mean and
  is the sample size.

The quantity  corresponds to the combined probability represented by the two tails of the normal distribution that fall outside of the probability band .

where
  is probability represented by one tail of the normal distribution and
  = sample size.

Eq.1 is analogous to the -score equation (Eq.4).

where
  is the  -score,
  is the sample value,
  is the mean of standard normal distribution, and
  is the standard deviation of standard normal distribution.

Using this method  can be determined for any sample size. In Excel,  can be found with the following formula:  =ABS(NORM.S.INV(1/(4n))).

Calculation
To apply Chauvenet's criterion, first calculate the mean and standard deviation of the observed data. Based on how much the suspect datum differs from the mean, use the normal distribution function (or a table thereof) to determine the probability that a given data point will be at the value of the suspect data point. Multiply this probability by the number of data points taken.

Example
For instance, suppose a value is measured experimentally in several trials as 9, 10, 10, 10, 11, and 50, and we want to find out if 50 is an outlier. 

First, we find .

  

Then we find  by plugging  into the Quantile Function. 

Then we find the z-score of 50.

From there we see that  and can conclude that 50 is an outlier according to Chauvenet's Criterion.

Peirce's criterion
Another method for eliminating spurious data is called Peirce's criterion.  It was developed a few years before Chauvenet's criterion was published, and it is a more rigorous approach to the rational deletion of outlier data.  Other methods such as Grubbs's test for outliers are mentioned under the listing for Outlier.

Criticism
Deletion of outlier data is a controversial practice frowned on by many scientists and science instructors; while Chauvenet's criterion provides an objective and quantitative method for data rejection, it does not make the practice more scientifically or methodologically sound, especially in small sets or where a normal distribution cannot be assumed.  Rejection of outliers is more acceptable in areas of practice where the underlying model of the process being measured and the usual distribution of measurement error are confidently known.

References

Bibliography
 Taylor, John R.  An Introduction to Error Analysis.  2nd edition.  Sausalito, California: University Science Books, 1997. pp 166–8.
 Barnett, Vic and Lewis, Toby. "Outliers in Statistical Data". 3rd  edition. Chichester: J.Wiley and Sons, 1994. .
Aicha Zerbet, Mikhail Nikulin. A new statistics for detecting outliers in exponential case, Communications in Statistics: Theory and Methods, 2003, v.32, pp. 573–584.

Chauvenet
Statistical outliers